The following events occurred in September 1903:

September 1, 1903 (Tuesday)
At Dover, England, British swimmer Montague Holbein begins his fourth attempt to swim across the English Channel.
A miners' strike in Idaho Springs, Colorado, United States, that started on May 1, is brought to an end by the Western Federation of Miners.
Henry Weilbrenner, a farmer from Syosset, Long Island, New York, attempts to assassinate U.S. President Theodore Roosevelt at Sagamore Hill. A United States Secret Service agent foils the attempt by knocking Weilbrenner's revolver from his hand. Two other men are heard prowling about the grounds at the same time, but Weilbrenner claims to have acted alone. He will be declared insane on September 2.

September 2, 1903 (Wednesday)
 Montague Holbein abandons his attempt to swim across the English Channel after the tide turns when he is within  of the French coast.
 Died: Julia McNair Wright, American author (b. 1840)

September 3, 1903 (Thursday)
Reliance, entered by the New York Yacht Club, defeats Shamrock III, representing the Royal Ulster Yacht Club, successfully defending the 1903 America's Cup.

September 4, 1903 (Friday)
In Widewater, Virginia, a prospective test flight of the Langley Aerodrome is abandoned due to the accidental destruction of the aircraft's port propeller during engine testing. Charles M. Manly, the Aerodrome's test pilot, prevents more serious damage to the aircraft by shutting the engine down. The Aerodrome will make two unsuccessful test flights on October 7 and December 8.
Nadir of American race relations: In Armourdale, Kansas, an unidentified African American man attempts to strangle Mrs. Margaret Gerahn, a white woman. A mob pursues the man to the Kansas River, where he drowns himself in order to avoid being lynched.
At the Selma, California, post office, J. E. Harris, former Chief of the San Diego Police Department, threatens surveyor W. H. Shafer with a shotgun while under the influence of alcohol. Shafer, who is involved in a dispute with Harris over wood that they both claim, shoots Harris to death with a revolver.
Born: Princess Anna of Saxony, seventh and youngest child of Frederick Augustus III of Saxony and his wife Archduchess Luise of Austria, Princess of Tuscany (died 1976)
Died: Hermann Zumpe, German conductor and composer, apoplexy (b. 1850)

September 5, 1903 (Saturday)
Irish painter Henry Jones Thaddeus receives permission to paint a portrait of Pope Pius X.
Dick Molyneux becomes manager of Brentford football club, leaders of the UK's Southern League First Division.

September 6, 1903 (Sunday)

September 7, 1903 (Monday)
Arthur Rowley, playing for Burslem Port Vale against Bolton Wanderers, becomes the first player in British football history to score from a direct free kick.
The Federation of American Motorcyclists is founded in New York City.

September 8, 1903 (Tuesday)
Boxer Joe Riley (also known as Oliver Knight) collapses after a six-round fight with Griff Jones in Philadelphia, Pennsylvania. He will die at St. Agnes Hospital on September 10.
Anderson Garred, an escapee from the Mendocino State Asylum, shoots and kills Andrew J. McKinnon, a former Oregon county sheriff, in Guerneville, California. Garred will be captured on December 22 near Red Bluff, California. On May 13, 1904, a jury will pronounce Garred insane.
Born: Jane Arbor, British author (d. 1994)

September 9, 1903 (Wednesday)
18-year-old Special Agent Andrew Creason of the Chicago, Rock Island and Pacific Railway Police Department is assaulted at the railroad's coal and material yard in Chickasha, Oklahoma. Creason is struck on the head with a blunt object, causing multiple fractures to his skull. He will remain unconscious at the company hospital until his death on September 19. No suspects will ever be identified in Creason's murder.
Texas State University opens in San Marcos, Texas, United States, with Thomas G. Harris as its principal and around 300 students.
Born: Phyllis A. Whitney, American mystery writer, in Yokohama, Japan (died 2008)

September 10, 1903 (Thursday)
Born: Cyril Connolly, English critic, in Coventry (died 1974)

September 11, 1903 (Friday)
An Atlantic hurricane strikes Fort Lauderdale, Florida, United States, resulting in 14 deaths and extensive damage.
The Milwaukee Mile racetrack in West Allis, Wisconsin, United States, then a dirt track, holds its first motor race.
Born: Theodor W. Adorno, German philosopher and sociologist, in Frankfurt am Main, as Theodor Ludwig Wiesengrund (died 1969)

September 12, 1903 (Saturday)
The U.S. armored cruiser  is launched at Newport News Shipbuilding, Virginia.
Arthur Schnitzler's one-act play, Der Puppenspieler ("The Puppet Master"), is premièred at the Deutsches Theater in Berlin, Germany.

September 13, 1903 (Sunday)
Vladimir Lenin writes to Alexander Potresov, apologising for his irascible behaviour but refusing to accept that his recent decisions might be wrong.
Born: Claudette Colbert, American actress, in Saint-Mandé, France, as Émilie Claudette Chauchoin (died 1996)
Died: Carl Schuch, 56, Austrian painter (degenerative disease)

September 14, 1903 (Monday)
The Serbian football club FK Šumadija 1903 is founded in Kragujevac.
British prime minister Arthur Balfour agrees to the resignation from the Cabinet of Joseph Chamberlain, the Secretary of State for the Colonies, over the issue of free trade.
Died: Alice Gordon Gulick, American missionary in Spain, tuberculosis (b. 1847)

September 15, 1903 (Tuesday)
The Brazilian football club Grêmio Foot-Ball Porto Alegrense is founded in Porto Alegre, by European immigrants Andy Fairbank and Paul Cochlin.

September 16, 1903 (Wednesday)
The 1903 New Jersey hurricane makes landfall near Atlantic City, United States, with winds of 80 mph (130 km/h). It is the only hurricane ever known to have hit the state of New Jersey.
Born: Rabbi Yosef Greenwald to his father Rabbi Yaakov Yehezkiya Greenwald in Brezovica (Hungary).

September 17, 1903 (Thursday)
Born: Karel Miljon, Dutch boxer (d. 1984)

September 18, 1903 (Friday)
Died: Alexander Bain, Scottish philosopher, 85

September 19, 1903 (Saturday)
A weekly newspaper, the Gaelic American, is launched in New York, United States, by John Devoy.

September 20, 1903 (Sunday)
Born: Gertrud Arndt, German photographer, in Ratibor, Upper Silesia (d. 2000)

September 21, 1903 (Monday)
A solar eclipse takes place.
In the Serbian parliamentary elections, Sava Grujić of the People's Radical Party wins enough votes to form a government in coalition with several independent members.

September 22, 1903 (Tuesday)
The 1903 Norwegian Football Cup Final is won by Odds BK.
Italo Marchiony, an ice cream salesman from New York, United States, files for a patent of a machine to manufacture ice cream cones.
Died: Nicholas John Brown, 64, Australian politician, Speaker of the Tasmanian House of Assembly

September 23, 1903 (Wednesday)

September 24, 1903 (Thursday)
Edmund Barton, after experiencing health concerns, resigns as Prime Minister of Australia to join the newly established High Court of Australia as a judge. He is replaced by Alfred Deakin.
British warship  is launched at Armstrong Whitworth's Elswick shipyard.

September 25, 1903 (Friday)
An earthquake of magnitude 6.5 strikes Razavi Khorasan Province, Persia, killing 350 people.
Born: Mark Rothko, Latvian/US painter, in Dvinsk, as Markus Yakovlevich Rothkowitz (d. 1970)

September 26, 1903 (Saturday)
New Zealand becomes the first country in the world to pass a Wireless Telegraphy Act.

The Sherlock Holmes short story "The Adventure of the Empty House" by Sir Arthur Conan Doyle is published for the first time in Collier's in the United States. This is the story in which Holmes returns after his apparent death in "The Adventure of the Final Problem".

September 27, 1903 (Sunday)

"Wreck of the Old 97": En route from Monroe, Virginia, to Spencer, North Carolina, the "Fast Mail", travelling too fast in order to keep to its timetable, becomes derailed at the Stillhouse Trestle near Danville, Virginia, United States. Eleven people are killed and seven injured.

September 28, 1903 (Monday)
Born: Tateo Katō, Japanese fighter ace; in Asahikawa, Hokkaido, Japan (d. 1942, killed in action)
Died: Samuel A. Ward, American organist and composer, author of the best-known melody for "America the Beautiful" (b. 1848)

September 29, 1903 (Tuesday)
Prussia, part of the German Empire, introduces compulsory driver licensing for motor vehicles.

September 30, 1903 (Wednesday)
New school buildings are opened at Gresham's School, Norfolk, England, by Field Marshal Sir Evelyn Wood.
British boxer Bob Fitzsimmons defeats Irishman Con Coughlin by knockout in the first round of a bout at the Washington Sporting Club in Philadelphia, Pennsylvania. Coughlin will die the following day of head injuries sustained in the fight.

References

1903
1903-09
1903-09